Adp or ADP  may refer to:

Aviation 
 Aéroports de Paris, airport authority for the Parisian region in France
 Aeropuertos del Perú, airport operator for airports in northern Peru
 SLAF Anuradhapura, an airport in Sri Lanka
 Ampara Airport, an airport in Sri Lanka (IATA: ADP)

Computing 
 Acyclic dependencies principle, a software design principle
 Android Dev Phone, a device sold by Google for Android developers
 Attach Detection Protocol, a communication protocol used internally by the USB On-The-Go standard

Organizations and companies 
 ADP, Inc., an American provider of human resources management software and services
 Association of Directory Publishers, an international trade organization for print and online directory publishers
 Alpha Delta Phi (ΑΔΦ), a fraternal organization on college campuses
 Alpha Delta Pi (ΑΔΠ), a sorority organization on college campuses
 Association for the Development of Pakistan, a Boston-based non-profit organization
 Agua del Pueblo (AdP), a non-profit, technical assistance organization, founded in Guatemala in 1972

People 
 Alessandro Del Piero (born 1974), Italian footballer
 Adrian Peterson (born 1985), American football player

Politics and government 
 Action Democratic Party (Nigeria)
 Alabama Democratic Party, the local branch of the Democratic Party in the state of Alabama
 Alaska Democratic Party, the local branch of the Democratic Party in the state of Alaska
 Arizona Democratic Party, the local branch of the Democratic Party in the state of Arizona
 Arkansas Democratic Party, the local branch of the Democratic Party in the state of Arkansas
 Azerbaijan Democratic Party
 Arab Democratic Party (Israel), a former political party in Israel
 Arab Democratic Party (Lebanon), a political party in Lebanon
 Amhara Democratic Party, a former political party in Ethiopia
 California Department of Alcohol and Drug Programs, Californian agency dealing with substance abuse prevention and treatment
 American Democracy Project (AASCU initiative), a project of the AASCU to promote understanding of civic engagement among college students
 American Democracy Project (527 group in Florida)
 Assyrian Democratic Party (Syria), an Eastern Assyrian party in Syria

Science and technology 
 Adenosine diphosphate, an organic compound essential in metabolism, resulting from the transfer of energy from ATP
 Ammonium dihydrogen phosphate or monoammonium phosphate (MAP), an optical crystal
 Air displacement plethysmography, a method to determine the percentage of body fat
 Antidepressant Pill, a medication taken to alleviate clinical depression or dysthymia
 Notation in dependency grammars for an adposition

Other uses 
 Adap language, a dialect of Dzongkha, the national language of Bhutan
 Andorran peseta, a former currency of Andorra
 Actual deferral percentage, a 401(k) test for highly compensated employees